Samuel Cole (September 1874 – after 1899) was an English professional footballer who played in the Football League for Small Heath.

Career
Cole was born in Smethwick, Staffordshire. He was on the books of Stoke as an amateur, but never appeared for the first team, and then played for Smethwick Centaur before joining Small Heath in August 1898. Cole was a regular in the reserves, playing in all forward positions, but played only once for the first team. This occurred on 10 March 1900, when Cole was a spectator at the Second Division game at home to Burton Swifts. Centre-forward Bob McRoberts dropped out at the last minute, and twelfth man Billy Walton had travelled with the reserves, so Cole was called out of the crowd to play. Small Heath won 2–1. At the end of the 1899–1900 season, Cole returned to local non-league football with Harborne.

Career statistics

References

1874 births
Year of death missing
Sportspeople from Smethwick
English footballers
Association football forwards
Stoke City F.C. players
Birmingham City F.C. players
English Football League players
Date of birth missing